Janacópulos is a surname. Notable people with the surname include:

Adriana Janacópulos (1897–1978), Brazilian sculptor
Vera Janacópulos (1886 or 1892–1955), Brazilian singer